Stuart Edgington, known as Stuart Edge, is an American actor and entertainer best known for his viral internet videos that have garnered over 500 million views and gained him a social audience of over 3 million followers. Stuart has been featured as a performer on Late Night with Jimmy Fallon and EXTRA with Mario Lopez and Maria Menounos. His videos have been mentioned on shows and websites like Good Morning America, Today, CNN, Billboard, and have also caught the eye of many celebrities like Chris Pratt, Carly Rae Jepsen, Scooter Braun, and Justin Bieber. In 2018, Stuart had his acting debut as John Brooke in the movie "Little Women" acting alongside Lea Thompson, Lucas Grabeel and Ian Bohen.

Early life 
Edge was born on March 27, 1989 in Utah. He is a member of the Church of Jesus Christ of Latter-day Saints. When he was 14 his parents divorced and he moved to Mexico with his mother and brothers. He graduated with an associate degree from Utah Valley University.

Edge wrote about his rise from porta potties cleaner to YouTube star in his book "On the Edge: How My Crappy Job Changed My Life".

YouTube

"Using Siri To Get A Date/Married" 
Two years after the initial release of Siri, Edge came up with the idea to team up with his friends to do it again. The first video titled "Using Siri To Get A Date" was released on October 23, 2013, and the second video titled "Using Siri To Get Married" was released on September 16, 2015.

Justin Bieber Sorry Dance Video 
Edge made a video with his partner Weixin Le where they dance to Justin Bieber's Sorry song in 31 different Halloween costumes. The video was released on October 30, 2015 and received so much attention that Justin Bieber tweeted a link to the video.

"Deserving Family Gets Christmas Makeover" 
Edge serves Day 8 in the Church of Jesus Christ of Latter-day Saints' 12 Days of Social where they asked 12 YouTube stars to share their talents through music and spoken word and also offer their fans a unique testimony of Jesus Christ. The series took place from December 1 to December 12, 2015 and  featured Alex Boyé, Jenny Oaks Baker, Lexi Walker and the Gardiner Sisters.

Edge teamed up with his family, friends, and local businesses to provide a Christmas for a family whose father died unexpectedly one year before the campaign.

"World's Strongest Kid" 
Edge teamed up with Make-A-Wish Foundation to make a kid named Beckham wish come true, who was born with one kidney and was diagnosed with end-stage kidney failure and had a kidney transplant, whose wish was to become a YouTube personality. Edge helped Beckham to film a prank.

Mexico Veracruz Mission 

Edge as a part of the Church of Jesus Christ of Latter-day Saints has served a mission from 2008 to 2010 in Veracruz, Mexico. Edge can speak Spanish fluently.

References

External links 
 

1989 births
Living people
Latter Day Saints from Utah
American YouTubers
Writers from Utah
American male comedians
21st-century American comedians
English-language YouTube channels
American expatriates in Mexico